Chemerina is a genus of moths in the family Geometridae.

Species
 Chemerina caliginearia (Rambur, 1833)

References
 Chemerina at Markku Savela's Lepidoptera and Some Other Life Forms
 Natural History Museum Lepidoptera genus database

Geometridae genera
Ennominae